KB-16 is a nitrosocarbamate vesicant. KB-16 is part of the corneal clouding chemical warfare agents. KB-16 clouds the cornea for a long time.

See also
Lewisite
Sulfur mustard
HN1 (nitrogen mustard)
HN2 (nitrogen mustard)
HN3 (nitrogen mustard)
Nitrosourea

References

Blister agents
Nitrosocarbamates
Chloroethyl compounds
Methyl esters